Piet Schrijvers (15 December 1946 – 7 September 2022) was a Dutch professional football manager and player who played as a goalkeeper. At international level, he was a member of the Netherlands squads which finished runner up in both the 1974 and 1978 FIFA World Cups. At club level, he spent nine years with AFC Ajax, winning five Eredivisie titles and two KNVB Cups.

References

External links

1946 births
2022 deaths
People from Nieuwegein
Dutch footballers
Footballers from Utrecht (province)
Association football goalkeepers
Netherlands international footballers
1974 FIFA World Cup players
1978 FIFA World Cup players
UEFA Euro 1976 players
UEFA Euro 1980 players
Eredivisie players
AFC DWS players
FC Twente players
AFC Ajax players
PEC Zwolle players
Dutch football managers
AZ Alkmaar managers
TOP Oss managers
PEC Zwolle managers
FC Twente non-playing staff
PEC Zwolle non-playing staff
20th-century Dutch people
21st-century Dutch people